The fortress of Ulm (Bundesfestung Ulm) was one of five federal fortresses of the German Confederation around the cities of Ulm and Neu-Ulm. With its 9 km polygonal main circumvallation Ulm had the biggest fortress in Germany in the 19th century and it is still one of the biggest in Europe.

After the final defeat of Napoleon in 1815, the victorious powers agreed to defend the states from the inside. The fortresses were one of the few realised projects of the confederation. The fortress Ulm was planned by the Prussian construction manager Moritz Karl Ernst von Prittwitz und Gaffron and built under his supervision between 1842 and 1859.

In peacetimes the fortress should hold 5,000 men of the federal army, in wartimes up to 20,000 soldiers. A plan to expand the fortress to hold 100,000 men was never realised. The building costs were valued at 16,5 mio. guilders.

The fortress is a closed, polygonal wall system around the cities of Ulm in the Kingdom of Württemberg and Neu-Ulm in the Kingdom of Bavaria. In some distance detached works were added. The at this time first stone bridge across the Danube laid between both cities inside of the fortress. The next stone bridge was in Regensburg.

For the first time the bastion system was given up and replaced by a polygonal system with detached works, which is called Neupreußische Manier (New Prussian Fortress System) or Neudeutsche Manier (New German Fortress System). The later constructed works at the upper Eselsberg were built as so-called "Biehler-Forts".

List of works

Ulm

City circumvallation

Forts 

1) The Fort Oberer Kuhberg was also an early concentration camp between 1933 and 1935. One well-known prisoner was the SPD politician Kurt Schumacher.

2) That work no. was planned to be a turret in the Ruhe valley, which was not built for financial reasons.

3) The work no. was passed to Fort Oberer Eselsberg Hauptwerk in 1881.

Neu-Ulm

City circumvallation

Forts 

The fort 10 (near Offenhausen) and the gun turret 11 on the railroad Ulm – Munich were not built for cost reasons. The plans for work XLI Friedrichsau had to be changed for this. Work 14 was to be work 15, between 13 and 15 a small fort was planned and later also canceled. The fort Illerkanal was nameless until the completion of the Iller channel in 1906. An additional fort near Pfuhl was planned in the mid-1860s, but cancelled due to the dissolution of the German Confederation. Instead of the fort the infantry base Kapellenberg was built in the 1900s (see below).

Expansion of fortification between 1881 and 1914 
As the weapons were improved, the fortress had to be improved too. On Fort Oberer Kuhberg, the front wall and side towers were reduced in height, and around many forts, infantry fences were installed. Two new forts were built on the Eselsberg (see #Forts).

1901–1910 
Between 1901 and 1910 several new buildings were constructed to support the fortress. These buildings were (beginning with Böfingen and moving counterclockwise around Ulm):

1914–1916 
The last major expansion of the front line took place in the first years of World War I. 93 works were to be built or improved, the majority of them were never actually constructed or completed. The numbering began with the trench 1 between Obertalfingen and Böfingen, went counterclockwise around Ulm and Neu-Ulm and ended with trench 78 on the other side of the Danube. Between the bases 21 and 22 was the trench 21a. In the south an own front line was to be installed, consisting of the bases 3c near Ludwigsfeld and 2b south of Wiblingen, and the trenches 2a, 3a, 3a II, 4a, 4a II, 1b, 1b II, 3b, 4b, 1c and 2c.

74 of these works were to be trenches. The works 3, 8, 14, 18, 21, 37, 45, 54, 58, 63, 76, 2b and 3c were to be infantry bases. Only the bases 45 in the Maienwäldle and 58 south of Neu-Ulm are completely preserved. The bases Spitzäcker, Lehr, Weinberge and Kapellenberg and the forts Oberer Eselsberg Hauptwerk and Oberer Eselsberg Nebenwerk were improved and integrated in the numbering system as works 22, 26, 32, 70, 29 and 30 respectively.

Furthermore 20 artillery rooms, 10 munition rooms, 4 pump stations and 9 so-called "Zwischenraumstreichen", which could cover long gaps between some works, were built behind the front lines. Of them only the pump station Buchbrunnen and the Zwischenraumstreiche 6 exist still today.

Infrastructure buildings 
In Ulm and Neu-Ulm were several buildings bought or built for the garrisons.

Furthermore several officer's messes, powder magazines, artillery depots and the like were erected. Some of the buildings still stand today, but are used differently with exceptions: The civilian prison is still in use today as a place of detention and the churches were opened for the citizens as Pauluskirche (Protestant) and St. Georg (catholic).

Gallery

References

External links 

Förderkreis Bundesfestung Ulm e.V.
Views of Fort Oberer Kuhberg

Buildings and structures demolished in 1971
Ulm
Forts in Germany
German Confederation
Military installations established in 1842